Takhtiabad (also Romanized as Takhtīābād) is a village in Kolyai Rural District, in the Central District of Asadabad County, Hamadan Province, Iran. At the 2006 census, its population was 92, in 17 families.

References 

Populated places in Asadabad County